Voodoo Circle is a German hard rock band founded in 2008, as a project of Silent Force guitarist Alex Beyrodt (currently also playing with heavy metal band Primal Fear) who had the idea to re-think his personal vision of music, making songs more based on his early influences, such as Whitesnake, Yngwie Malmsteen, Deep Purple and Rainbow.

After the debut album called Alex Beyrodt's Voodoo Circle, the project became a collaborative band, composed mainly of Alex Beyrodt on guitar together with vocalist David Readman (Pink Cream 69) and bassist Mat Sinner (Beyrodt's bandmate on bands Primal Fear, Sinner and Silent Force) with the addition of a keyboard player and a drummer. On 5 May 2016, after doing 4 albums and tours, it was announced that original vocalist David Readman was leaving the band to focus on other activities. He was replaced by Herbie Langhans (Beyond the Bridge, ex-Sinbreed, ex-Seventh Avenue).

The band has gained some critical and commercial success with the 2011 album Broken Heart Syndrome. The last two Voodoo Circle albums with Readman on vocals are More Than One Way Home released in 2013 and Whisky Fingers released in 2015. The first album with Langhans on vocals is called Raised on Rock and was released on February 9, 2018, via AFM Records GmbH.

On October 19, 2020, AFM Records announced vocalist David Readman and drummer Markus Kullmann return and the new album Locked & Loaded that will be released on January 15, 2021. The first single will be "Devil With An Angel Smile" and will arrive on October 30.

Band members

Present
Alex Beyrodt – Guitars (2008–present)
Mat Sinner – Bass/Producer (2008–2016, 2017–present)
David Readman – Vocals (2008–2016, 2020-present)
Markus Kullmann – Drums (2009-2014, 2020-present)

Former
Mel Gaynor – Drums (2008-2009)
Jimmy Kresic – Keyboards (2008-2013)
Alessandro Del Vecchio – Keyboards/Vocals (2013-2017)
Tim Husung – Drums (2014-2015)
Francesco Jovino – Drums (2015–2019)
Corvin Bahn - Keyboards session (2017-2018)
Herbie Langhans - Vocals (2017–2019)

Timeline

Discography

Studio albums
 Voodoo Circle (2008)
 Broken Heart Syndrome (2011)
 More Than One Way Home (2013)
 Whisky Fingers (2015)
 Raised on Rock (2018)
 Locked & Loaded (2021)

References

External links 
Official Voodoo Circle website
Voodoo Circle on Metal Archives

German heavy metal musical groups
German hard rock musical groups
Musical groups established in 2008